The following is a list of the 313 communes of the Lot department of France.

The communes cooperate in the following intercommunalities (as of 2020):
Communauté d'agglomération du Grand Cahors
Communauté de communes du Causse de Labastide Murat
Communauté de communes Causses et Vallée de la Dordogne
Communauté de communes Cazals-Salviac
Communauté de communes Grand-Figeac
Communauté de communes Ouest Aveyron Communauté
Communauté de communes du Pays de Lalbenque-Limogne
Communauté de communes du Quercy Blanc
Communauté de communes Quercy-Bouriane
Communauté de communes de la Vallée du Lot et du Vignoble

References

Lot